John Hedges (26 February 1688 – 20 June 1737), of Finchley, Middlesex, was an English diplomat and politician who sat in the House of Commons from 1722 to 1737.

Hedges was the fourth son of Sir William Hedges of Finchley, and his wife  Anne Nicol, daughter of Paul Nicoll of Hendon Place, Middlesex. His father was a merchant trading with Turkey, Governor of Bengal and Director of the Bank of England from 1699 to 1700. Hedges was admitted at Peterhouse, Cambridge on 6 May  1706  and at Inner Temple in February 1708.

Hedges was returned unopposed as Member of Parliament (MP)  for Mitchell at the  1722 general election. In 1726, he was sent as Envoy Extraordinary to Turin, where he assisted with negotiations on the repartition of the two Sicilies and the Milanese.  At the  1727 general election, he was returned unopposed as MP for Bossiney. In 1728, he was appointed Treasurer to the Prince of Wales, and held the post for the rest of his life. He was returned unopposed as MP for Fowey at the 1734 general election. He was a close friend and patron of artist Joseph Goupy.

Hedges died unmarried on  20 June 1737.

See also
 List of diplomats of the United Kingdom to Sardinia

References

1688 births
1737 deaths
People from Finchley
Members of the Parliament of Great Britain for English constituencies
British MPs 1722–1727
British MPs 1727–1734
British MPs 1734–1741